Scythropia is a genus of moths of the  family Plutellidae. It is usually separated in a monotypic subfamily Scythropiinae, but sometimes included in the Yponomeutinae of the Yponomeutidae.

They are sometimes called diamondback moths, which more often refers to Plutella xylostella of the fairly closely related Plutella.

Species
 Scythropia crataegella – Linnaeus, 1767

External links
 

Plutellidae
Taxa named by Jacob Hübner